Jean Camille Marius Monnier Benoît (14 August 1924 – 31 August 1995) was a French ski jumper. He competed in the individual event at the 1948 Winter Olympics.

References

External links
 

1924 births
1995 deaths
French male ski jumpers
Olympic ski jumpers of France
Ski jumpers at the 1948 Winter Olympics
Sportspeople from Jura (department)